Nice is a city in the south of France.

Nice may also refer to:

 Niceness, or kindness

Places 
 Arrondissement of Nice an arrondissement (subdivision type) of France around the city of Nice
 County of Nice, a historical region of France
 İznik, Turkey, formerly known as Nicaea, and which Edward Gibbon refers to as Nice throughout The History of the Decline and Fall of the Roman Empire
 Nice (Thrace), a town of ancient Thrace
 Nice, California, a town in the United States

People 
 Nice (surname)
As a first name:
 Nice Githinji
 Nice Nailantei Leng'ete

Fictional characters 
 Nice (mythology), a daughter of Thespius, mother of Nicodromus in Greek mythology
 Captain Nice, titular character of the eponymous U.S. TV show
 Ultraman Nice, titular character of the eponymous Japanese TV show
 Nice Holystone, explosives enthusiast in the Baccano! series

Technology 
 Nice (mobile app), a photo-sharing app in China
 nice (Unix), a command found on UNIX and other POSIX-like operating systems

Arts and entertainment

Television
 "Nice", the original title of "Miss Teacher Bangs a Boy", a South Park episode

Music 
 The Nice, a 1960s rock band
 Nice (The Nice album), a 1969 album by The Nice
 Nice (band), a 1990s indie rock group from Australia
 Nice (Nice album), a self-titled 1994 album by Nice
 Nice (Rollins Band album), 2001
 Nice (Puffy AmiYumi album), 2003
 "Nice" (song), a single from the 2004 album Astronaut by Duran Duran
 "Nice", a song from the 2007 album Exclusive by Chris Brown

Companies and organizations 

 OGC Nice, a French football club based in Nice

Adjective
 Nice model, a scenario for the dynamical evolution of the Solar System
 Nice name, a set theoretical concept used in mathematics
 Nice guy

Other 
 Nice (WIPO), a classification system used in trademarks
 Nice!, a private label brand of Walgreens
 Nice biscuit, a variety of biscuit

See also 
 NICE (disambiguation)
 
 Gneiss (pronounced in the same way as "nice"), a type of metamorphic rock
 Nise (disambiguation)
 Nais (disambiguation)